The Research Institute of Petroleum Industry, also known as NIOC-RIPI, often shortened to RIPI is a governmental research institute founded in 1959 in Tehran, Iran and is affiliated with National Iranian Oil Company.

The institute is a major research institute in Iran and is the largest of its kind in the Middle East. RIPI has become a major technology provider for Iran's petroleum industry. In 2002, it developed a technology that converts heavy crude oil into the more desirable, a new generation of GTL technology.

History
Research Institute of Petroleum Industry was initially established under the title of “Iran Petroleum Industry Research Development Office” in 1959. Its primary aim was carrying out research on application of petroleum materials. After revolution of Islamic Republic of Iran, the office was changed into a center for “Research and Scientific Services”( ) and it has continued its activities in order to achieve the objectives. In 1989, upon the formal agreement of the development council of Department of Culture and Higher Education, the center was called “Research Institute of Petroleum Industry” and with the aim of carrying out fundamental, applied, and developmental researchers has continued doing its activities.

Strategy of PIRI is creating added value via production and commercialization of technology, with the approach of carrying out research for development of new technologies and indigenization of new technologies.

55-year history of this center in research and development and also its many extra organizational projects and effective activities in the industry have resulted in its growth over the time.  Regarding its record and history, now PIRI is known as a pioneer of developing the technologies required by the industry.

Production of valuable products such as technical knowledge, patents, and presentation of papers in reputable magazines are other brilliant activities besides its main mission; and PIRI has had excellent performance in all of them. Of course among these activities, technical knowledge and patents are more important and PIRI has done very well in these fields, too.

Existence of huge investments such as human resources, equipment and unique capabilities of  PIRI have resulted in success and high income of PIRI in activities of  technology development (industrial and semi-industrial); among unique capabilities of  PIRI  we can refer to : technical development, transfer & indigenization of refinery technologies, advisory services for optimizing and solving the industries problems (petroleum industry, in particular),  giving license and designing the units which are under the license of oil and gas condensates refineries, comprehensive reservoir studies and presentation of  the field development plan, development of new technologies for solving the problem of  water, air and soil pollution, and protecting the oil facilities.  It should be mentioned that for the fourth consecutive year, PIRI has won the award on technical and engineering field.

In proclamation of supreme leader of Iran on general policies of resistive economy, there are two clauses which relate to enhancement in strategic reservoirs of oil and gas and increase in added value through completion of the value chain of gas and oil industry. PIRI is the key element in realization of these objectives. PIRI believes that the main factors in realization of these objectives are creation, development, and indigenization of required technologies in oil recovery and completion of the cycle of “science up to wealth”; thus one of the ways for reaching these goals is establishment of science-based companies.

In line with the goals of vision2025 document in which Iran is considered as a developed country occupying the first economic, scientific and technological place in the region; and by establishing an effective interaction in its international affairs, PIRI tries to reach the first scientific rank in the region. So, PIRI plays an outstanding role in realization of the vision document and even aims to realize science-based economy and international interactions.  The role of energy in Iran's economy and increase of its consumption in the country, made PIRI develop a complete and comprehensive plan for optimization of energy consumption.

PIRI, enjoying  from efficient and expert staff and also modern technologies and equipment, mostly has aimed to produce more added value  in order to achieve macro policies of the country in realization of science-based economy as the pivotal  pillar of the resistive economy,

Relying on new management, PIRI believes that with support and cooperation of managers, universities, scientific research centers, science-based companies and experienced contractors in the area of oil and gas industry, we can take big steps towards realization of high objectives of policyholders and planners of the country. Among those high objectives, we can refer to production and optimum use of reservoirs, offer and development of new technologies and consistent progress with protecting the production resources. Therefore, PIRI warmly welcomes all powerful and capable companies’ cooperation in industrialization of domestic technologies which we have referred to some of them in this booklet.

In line with macro policies of the oil industry and employing  a new approach,  PIRI  has classified its major activities into three sections of “production and optimum use of strategic oil and gas reserves”, “ offer and development of  new technologies in industries”, and “ consistent development   and protection of resources” and they have been publicized in 19th exhibition .

The research activities of RIPI are divided into three main sections, namely “Research and development of upstream petroleum industry Research Center”, “research and development of downstream petroleum industry Research Center” and “research and development of energy and environment Research Center”.

Staff
RIPI has 1628 staff including 145 Ph.Ds, 458 M.Scs and 281 B.Scs.

Sections
RIPI has three campuses:
 Upstream Petroleum Industry - studies are in association with geology, hydrocarbon reservoir, exploration, production and petroleum engineering and field management and development are performed. 
 Downstream Petroleum Industry - studies on refinery and petrochemical processes especially catalysts synthesis and characterization, nanotechnology, gas processing and distribution and polymer synthesis.
 Energy and Environment - deals with renewable energy such as fuel cell technology and the environmental issues regarding energy conversions.

Sub-sections and faculties are included in each campus, which in turn are hosts to research groups in the fields of oil and gas.

See also
Petroleum University of Technology
Higher education in Iran
Science and technology in Iran
National Iranian Oil Company

References 

 RIPI Wikipedia's article in Persian language

External links 

Research institutes in Iran
Universities in Iran
Education in Tehran
Educational institutions established in 1959
1959 establishments in Iran
Energy research institutes
Energy in Iran